Al-Ruqaita also spelled Al-Ruqaytah  is a Syrian village located in Hama Nahiyah in Hama District in Hama. It is located two kilometers south of the city of Hama. The village was founded in 2008.

References 

Populated places in Hama District